Ivanushki International (written in Russian as "Иванушки International") is a Russian boy band founded in Moscow in 1994.

The band was conceived by record producer Igor Matviyenko, and initially consisted of Andrei Grigoriev-Apollonov, Kirill Andreev, and primary vocalist Igor Sorin. They performed under several names (such as "Apollo–Soyuz") before settling on "Ivanushki International", a name meant to represent their intended blend of Russian ("Little Ivans") and international musical influences, and itself written half in Cyrillic, half in the Latin alphabet, with the second word read as in English.

Their debut album, Конечно он (Konyechno on, Of Course It's Him), was released in 1996. It included three cover versions of songs from the 1980s – "Вселенная" (Vselennaya, "The Universe"), originally performed by Alexander Ivanov, and "Рондо" (Rondo, "Roundabout"), "Этажи" (Etazhi, "Levels"), and "Малина" ("Malina", "Raspberry") by the group Class. However, it contained several original songs, including the hits "Тучи" (Tuchi, "Clouds"), "Колечко" (Kolechko, "The Ring"), "Где-то" (Gdye-to, "Somewhere"), and "Она" (Ona, "She"). The album gained huge commercial success.

A remixed version of the album followed one year later, Konyechno on remixed. The remixes were created by Lubeh keyboardist Igor Polonsky, Moral Code X keyboardist Konstantin Smirnov, and DJ Maxim Milyutenko. Alongside the remixed versions, the album contained the new hit "Кукла" (Kukla, "Doll") and a cover version of the Lubeh song "Дуся" (Dusya).

Ivanushki's second studio album, Твои письма (Tvoi pisma, Your Letters), released later in 1997, repeated the existing formula of original material and covers of past hits. It also included an audio letter from the group.

Later that year, Igor Sorin left to pursue a solo career, and was replaced by Oleg Yakovlev, who had appeared in the music video for "Doll". Without Sorin, the group continued its string of successes, releasing its perhaps best known song "Тополиный пух" (Topoliny pukh, "Poplar Fuzz"), a number-one hit in the summer of 1998.

On September 1, 1998, Sorin committed suicide, jumping from the window of his high-rise apartment, and died three days later. The following year, the group released Фрагменты жизни (Fragmenti iz zhizni, Fragments of Life), their tribute to him, which contained songs he had written prior to joining Ivanushki, as well as poems he had written, and a song dedicated to him, "Я тебя никогда не забуду" (Ya tyebya nikogda nye zabudu, "I Will Never Forget You").

Ivanushki released their first full album with Yakovlev as vocalist, Об этом я буду кричать всю ночь (Ob etom ya budu krichat' vsyu noch, I'll Shout About This All Night ), in April 1999. Recorded from August to November the previous year, it also contained singles such as "Topoliny pukh" that had already been released. It was followed in 2000 by Подожди меня... (Podoshdi menya, Wait for Me), after which the group released their first compilation album, Ivanushki.Best.Ru.

Although not having any studio album since 2002, Ivanushki kept on releasing successful singles; The latest songs of the Ivanushki International band: Tuchi Kruche recorded together with Khabib (Clouds are Cooler, Тучи Круче) (2022), Dve Zvezdi (Two stars, Две звезды) (2022).

Former member Oleg Yakovlev died on July 1, 2017, problably due to bilateral pneumonia or AIDS-related disease.

Discography
Studio albums

Compilation albums

Live albums

References

External links

Official site

Musical groups established in 1995
1995 establishments in Russia
Russian pop music groups
Russian boy bands
Musical groups from Moscow
Vocal trios
Winners of the Golden Gramophone Award